Yim Liu Ha is an area part of Sha Tau Kok, in North District, Hong Kong.

Administration
For electoral purposes, Yim Liu Ha is part of the Sha Ta constituency of the North District Council. It is currently represented by Ko Wai-kei, who was elected in the local elections.

History
Salt fields were historically farmed at Yim Liu Ha. Other salt fields were in Tai O on Lantau Island, San Hui and Wong Ka Wai in Tuen Mun, Yim Tin Tsai in Sai Kung and Yim Tin Tsai in Tai Po.

At the time of the 1911 census, the population of Yim Liu Ha was 47. The number of males was 29.

References

Further reading
 

Sha Tau Kok